Oeonosia pectinata is a moth of the family Erebidae. It was described by Rob de Vos in 2007. It is found in Papua New Guinea.

References

Lithosiina
Moths described in 2007